Thiare Jamilette Casarez Chinchillas (born 10 January 1993), known as Thiare Casarez, is a parasport athlete from Mexico competing mainly in category T13 sprint and middle distance racing events.

Casarez was selected to represent Mexico at the 2013 IPC Athletics World Championships in Lyon. She competed in the Women's 100m, 200m and 400m T13 races. Although she failed to medal in the 100 metres, she took silver in both the 200 and 400 metre races.

Notes

References

External links
 

1993 births
Living people
Sportspeople from Hermosillo
Mexican female sprinters
Paralympic athletes of Mexico
Visually impaired sprinters
Medalists at the World Para Athletics Championships
21st-century Mexican women